The football tournament at the 2001 Southeast Asian Games was held in Kuala Lumpur, Malaysia. It included a men's tournament, and was also the first Southeast Asian Games to include a women's tournament. The men's competition was held from 1 to 15 September 2001, while the women's tournament was held from 4 to 14 September 2001. The men's tournament was the first of the Southeast Asian Games to have an age limit, and has been played by U-23 (under 23 years old) national teams since then, while the women's tournament has no age limit. All matches were held in Kuala Lumpur, Malaysia.

Venues 
The men's tournament was played in Shah Alam Stadium, whilst the women's tournament was played in MPPJ Stadium, Kelana Jaya.

Medal winners

Men's tournament

Participants

Group stage

Group A

Group B

Knockout stage

Semi-finals

Bronze medal match

Final match

Winners

Goalscorers

5 goals
 Akmal Rizal Ahmad Rakhli
 Manit Noywech

4 goals
 Bambang Pamungkas
 Indra Sahdan Daud

3 goals
 Elie Aiboy
 Aung Tun Naing
 Teeratep Winothai

2 goals
 Budi Sudarsono
 Maman
 Phengta Phounsamay
 Mohd Nizaruddin Yusof
 Yan Paing
 Fadzuhasny Juraimi
 Sarawut Treephan
 Thạch Bảo Khanh

1 goal
 Jasriman Johari
 Isnan Ali
 Indra Putra Mahayuddin
 Irwan Fadzli Idrus
 Mohd Nizam Jamil
 Nay Thu Hlaing
 Soe Myat Min
 Tint Naing Tun Thein
 Mohd Faizal Sazali
 Ratna Suffian
 Anucha Kitpongsri
 Datsakorn Thonglao
 Jukkpant Punpee
 Narongchai Vachiraban
 Sakda Joemdee
 Rungpoj Tawanchri
 Nguyễn Minh Nghĩa
 Nguyễn Quốc Trung
 Tô Đức Cường

Final ranking

Women's tournament

Participants

Group stage

Group A

Group B

Knockout stage

Semi-finals

Bronze medal match

Gold medal match

Winners

Goalscorers

7 goals
 Lưu Ngọc Mai
3 goals
 Mar Lin Win
 Ngamsom Chaiyawut
 Bùi Thị Hiền Lương
2 goals
 Hla Hla Than
 Nuenggrutai Srathongvian
 Nguyễn Thị Mai Lan

1 goal
 Yakomina Swabra
 Rozana Roslan
 Widiya Habibah
 Aye Nandar Hlaing
 Moe Moe War
 Mar Lar Win
 My Nilar Htwe
 Nu Nu Khaine Win
 Zin Mar Win
 Penrapai Promphuy
 Pranee Saipin
 Prapa Buathong
 Sirinard Paturat
 Đoàn Thị Kim Chi
 Nguyễn Thị Hà
 Nguyễn Thị Thuý Nga
Own goal
 Gan Hwee Fern (For Vietnam)

Final ranking

References

2001 Southeast Asian Games events
Football at the Southeast Asian Games
Southeast Asian Games
2001
2001 in Malaysian football